Sorcha Ní Chéide, is an Irish actress who works extensively in Irish-language television, stage and screen.
She is most famous for her role as "Ríona de Burca" on the long-running Irish language drama, Ros na Rún.

Other roles have included An Gaeilgeoir Nocht and Rásaí na Gaillimhe.

In 2016, she portrayed Helena Molony in the television series Seven Women.

In 2020, she voiced Lulu in the Irish dubbing of Sadie Sparks.

References

External links
 http://r0snarun.com/index.php?option=com_content&view=section&id=57&Itemid=78

Year of birth missing (living people)
Living people
Irish stage actresses
Irish television actresses
People from County Galway
TG4 people
20th-century Irish people
21st-century Irish people